Thierry Devaux (also known as Terry Do; born 16 November 1959), developed acrobatic bungee jumping. His landing on the Statue of Liberty was the feat that gave him mainstream awareness. He designed several techniques to transform bungee jumps into sport field.

Personal
 Main Spirit  
He uses elastic cord to perform an aesthetical move akin. He performs 8 to 12 acrobatic jumps during two-hour training with the help of his Jumar or with a winch to lift him up.

Jumps
Thierry used a dynamometer and a variometer as early as November 1988 to measure the distortion of an elastic rope, the various bounces and the forces that the jumper has to endure.
A climbing rope can accommodate a 30% stretch in case of a fall in order to avoid body trauma. An elastic rope typically stretches by a factor of 3.5~4.5 of its initial length (250~350%).

Monuments and shows

Eiffel Tower
On October 27, 1991, Thierry Devaux, along with mountain guide Hervé Calvayrac, performed  six figures from the second level of the Eiffel Tower, at 115 meters.

Olympic Games 
In February 1992, Thierry, with mountain guide Alain Ledoux, performed a series of nine figures during 1992 Winter Olympics from a cable car of Val-d'Isère on the night of Alberto Tomba's historic victory.

Golden Gate Bridge 
In June 1992, with his lifelong coach Martine Giroud and following an ill-prepared attempt, Thierry made six figures 90 meters above the Pacific from the Golden Gate Bridge.

Brooklyn Bridge 
In June 1993, following thirteen reconnoiters inside the metal structure and with the help of mountain guide and spelunking instructor Simon Destombes, he performed eight jumps above the East River from Brooklyn Bridge.

Statue of Liberty 
Thierry landed a paramotor on the torch of the Statue of Liberty on August 23, 2001, after taking off from New Jersey. The goal of this landing was to perform three figures by directly climbing through his bungee.

In 1993, Thierry Devaux spent the night alone inside the Statue. He climbed all the way to the flame for a technical scouting. At 8.00 a.m., he met the only cleaning man allowed to polish the plated flame once a week since 21 years. The police were baffled and the matter was closed.

In 1994, after another night in the national monument, he was waiting inside the flame with a friend and 60 kg worth of equipment. He was accidentally discovered by the shooting crew of an advertisement. The police took the matter seriously this time when finding him yet again inside the flame despite the increased security measures. A complaint was lodged but no case was made against him even seven years later. The matter was hushed up by the two parties and did not get media coverage.

In November 2000, he took off 1.7 km from Liberty Island, and for approximately one minute flew over the flame - a mere centimeters above - together with his acrobatic gear and his rope, but could not land because of strong winds. He finally jettisoned his bungee into the sea and landed on a golf course construction site in Bayonne, New Jersey. The police did not detain him.

On August 23, 2001, after having taken off under a light breeze and having flown over the same seaway, he was in front of the flame at 9:15, but the wind had completely dropped for several seconds. The first approach was too high by 1.50 meter. After a second nightly aerial approach with a figure of eight at 21 km/h instead of 5–7 km/h, he landed flat but could not catch the torch barrier. He then stayed hanging four meters under the flame.

During an afternoon press conference, Mayor Rudolph Giuliani stressed the heroism of the NYPD. The charge of deterioration of the Statue was not upheld, and he was fined $7,065 for the paramotor landing.  The judge asked that the fine be covered by the auction of the equipment.

References

External links 
 Rapsodia Agency photos coverage

Living people
1959 births
People from Dubai
Sportspeople from Bourg-en-Bresse
Bungee jumpers